Beltanelliformis is a genus of discoid fossil from the Ediacaran period containing the two species B. brunsae and B. minutae, sometimes ascribed to the Ediacaran Biota. The chemical signature obtained from organically preserved specimens points to a cyanobacterial affinity (cf. Nostoc). Depending on its preservation, it is sometimes referred to as Nemiana or Beltanelloides.

References

Ediacaran life
Ediacaran
Enigmatic prehistoric animal genera
Aquatic animals
Cyanobacteria